Albert Hemrom is an Indian prelate who has been chosen as Coadjutor Bishop-Elect of Dibrugarh, India and successor of the current bishop. He succeeded as Bishop of the Roman Catholic diocese of Dibrugarh on 15 February 2021.

Early life 
Albert was born on 27 February 1970 in Konapathar, Tinsukia, Assam, India to Mr. Cyril Hemrom and Mrs. Josephine Purty. He is the eldest among two sisters and three brothers. He received his primary education from Assamese primary school and Don Bosco School Doom Dooma. He studied at St. Joseph’s Minor Seminary, Dibrugarh, Christ the King College, Shillong, and at Oriens Theological College, Shillong. He also holds a Licentiate in Canon Law from St. Peter’s Pontifical College, Bangalore and a Doctorate from the Pontifical Lateran University.

Priesthood 
Albert was ordained a Catholic priest for the Roman Catholic Diocese of Dibrugarh on 25 April 1999. After his ordination he has served as Prefect of Studies at St. Joseph’s Minor Seminary, Dibrugarh, Parish Priest, St. Francis of Assisi Church, Rajabari, and Visiting Professor at Oriens Theological College, Shillong. He is Judicial Vicar of the Diocesan Tribunal and Rector of St. Joseph’s Minor Seminary, Dibrugarh. He is Member of the College of Consultors and of the Priests Council, as well as Secretary of Laity and Family Commission, Vocation Promoter and Visiting Professor of Canon Law at Oriens Theological College, Shillong.

Episcopate 
He was appointed Coadjutor Bishop of Dibrugarh on 2 December 2018 by Pope Francis. He was consecrated on 3 March 2019 at Grounds of the Bishop's House, Dibrugarh, Diocese of Dibrugarh.

References 

21st-century Roman Catholic bishops in India
1970 births
Living people
Pontifical Lateran University alumni
People from Tinsukia district